USS O-3 (SS-64) was one of 16 O-class submarines built for the United States Navy during World War I.

Description
The O-class submarines were designed to meet a Navy requirement for coastal defense boats. They displaced  on the surface and  submerged. The O-class submarines had a crew of 29 officers and enlisted men.

For surface running, the boats were powered by two  diesel engines, each driving one propeller shaft. When submerged each propeller was driven by a  electric motor. They could reach  on the surface and  underwater.

The boats were armed with four 18-inch (450 mm) torpedo tubes in the bow. They carried four reloads, for a total of eight torpedoes. The O-class submarines were also armed with a single 3"/50 caliber deck gun.

Construction and career
O-3 was laid down on 2 December 1916 by Fore River Shipbuilding Company in Quincy, Massachusetts. She was launched on 27 September 1917, and commissioned on 13 June. 

The new submarine joined the Atlantic coastal patrol and kept watch for U-boats from Cape Cod to Key West, Florida. In November, she joined a 20-submarine contingent that departed Newport, Rhode Island, on 3 November for service in European waters.  However, before the ships had reached the Azores, the Armistice with Germany ended the fighting.

After the war that had proved the worth of subs, O-3 sailed to New London, Connecticut, to train Submarine School students.  Reclassified as a second line submarine on 25 July 1924 while at Coco Solo, Panama Canal Zone, and reverting to a first liner on 6 June 1928, the vessel remained at New London until she moved to Philadelphia, Pennsylvania, to decommission on 6 June 1931.

As American involvement in World War II became imminent, O-3 recommissioned at Philadelphia on 3 February 1941 and sailed to New London in June to train submarine personnel at the submarine school there until war's end.  She then steamed to Portsmouth, New Hampshire, to decommission on 11 September 1945. She was struck from the Naval Vessel Register on 11 October 1945 and sold to John J. Duane Company, for scrapping on 4 September 1946.

Awards
World War I Victory Medal
American Defense Service Medal
American Campaign Medal
World War II Victory Medal

Notes

References

External links
 

United States O-class submarines
World War I submarines of the United States
World War II submarines of the United States
Ships built in Quincy, Massachusetts
1917 ships